Cabezo Juré is an archaeological site located in Alosno, Huelva dated on the 3rd millennium BC. The archaeological excavations have recently revealed the vestiges of an ancient community of workers specialized in the metallurgy of copper. Evidence of their metallurgical activity has been found in remains of various furnaces obtained at temperatures close to 1 200 °C as well as large quantities of slag by SiO2 saturate silicates and copper products. Calibrated radiocarbon age revealed it was active between 2873 and 2274 BC.

References

Chalcolithic sites of Europe
Prehistoric sites in Spain
Ruins in Spain
Industrial archaeological sites
Megalithic monuments in Spain
Archaeological sites in Andalusia